Terry McLaurin (born September 15, 1995) is an American football wide receiver for the Washington Commanders of the National Football League (NFL). He played college football at Ohio State and was drafted by Washington in the third round of the 2019 NFL Draft. McLaurin was included on the 2019 PFWA All-Rookie Team and recorded three straight 1,000-yard seasons from 2020 to 2022, making his first Pro Bowl in 2022.

Early life
McLaurin was born on September 15, 1995, in Indianapolis, Indiana. He won the state's Mr. Football Award in 2013 while playing football for Cathedral High School. McLaurin was regarded as a four-star recruit in the class of 2014 according to the 247Sports Composite.

College career
McLaurin redshirted his freshman season in 2014. As a redshirt freshman for the Ohio State Buckeyes in 2015, McLaurin appeared in six games and recorded seven tackles and a fumble recovery. As a sophomore in 2016, he recorded 11 receptions for 114 receiving yards and two receiving touchdowns in 13 games. As a junior in 2017, he recorded 29 receptions for 436 receiving yards and six receiving touchdowns in 13 games. As a senior in 2018, he recorded 35 receptions for 701 receiving yards and 11 receiving touchdowns.

College statistics

Professional career

NFL Draft 
Leaving Ohio State as a redshirt senior, McLaurin was regarded as a special teamer and NFL backup, with potential to develop into a starter. NFL.com projected him to be a third round selection and compared him to Justin Hardee. After a draft process with impressive NFL Scouting Combine and Pro Day showings, some such as the IndyStar began to regard him as a potential draft steal.

2019
McLaurin was drafted by the Washington Redskins in the third round (76th overall) of the 2019 NFL Draft. With their first round pick in the same draft, the Redskins also drafted McLaurin's college QB, Dwayne Haskins. He signed his four-year rookie contract on June 6, 2019.

Due to a strong training camp performance, McLaurin was named a Week 1 starter. McLaurin made his NFL debut in the opening game of the 2019 season against the Philadelphia Eagles. There, he recorded five receptions for 125 yards, including a 69-yard touchdown. He added to that by catching at least five passes and a touchdown over the next two games, making him the first player in league history to achieve such a feat in their first three career appearances.

In Week 6 against the Miami Dolphins, McLaurin caught four receptions for 100 yards and two touchdowns as the Redskins won their first game of the season. During Week 15 against the Eagles, McLaurin finished with five receptions for 130 receiving yards, including a 75-yard touchdown. He finished the season with 58 receptions for 919 yards and seven touchdowns and was named to the PFWA All-Rookie Team.

2020

In Week 2, McLaurin recorded seven receptions for 125 receiving yards and his first touchdown of the season during a loss to the Arizona Cardinals. In a Week 4 loss against the Baltimore Ravens, McLaurin recorded 10 receptions for 118 yards. Following a season ending injury to team captain Landon Collins in October 2020, McLaurin was unanimously voted by his teammates to replace him. In a Week 9 loss against the New York Giants, he had seven receptions for 115 receiving yards and a touchdown. He suffered a high ankle sprain against the Seattle Seahawks in Week 15 and missed the following game against the Carolina Panthers as a result. Despite the team's unstable quarterback situation, he would finish the season with 1,118 yards and four touchdowns. The team won the NFC East division, securing a home playoff game against the Tampa Bay Buccaneers. The Washington Football Team lost to the eventual Super Bowl Champions 31-23 in the Wild Card Round. McLaurin recorded six catches for 75 yards in his first playoff game.

2021
In March 2021, Curtis Samuel signed a three-year contract with the Washington Football Team, reuniting McLaurin with his college roommate and fellow receiver. In a Week 2 game against the New York Giants on Thursday Night Football, McLaurin caught 11 receptions for 107 yards and a touchdown in a 30-29 victory. McLaurin recorded 123 yards off of six receptions and two touchdowns in the Week 4 win over the Atlanta Falcons. He recorded 103 yards off of three receptions and a touchdown in the 27-21 Week 11 win over the Carolina Panthers, this would be his fourth 100-plus yard game in the season. McLaurin left in the third quarter of the Week 14 game against the Dallas Cowboys due to a concussion. In the 2021 season, McLaurin started in all 17 games. He recorded 77 receptions for 1,053 receiving yards and five receiving touchdowns.

2022 
An impending free agent after the season, McLaurin decided against participating in on-field offseason workouts. On July 5, 2022, McLaurin signed a three-year contract extension worth $71 million with a $28 million signing bonus. In the 2022 season opening win over the Jacksonville Jaguars, he recorded 58 receiving yards off two receptions as well as a 49-yard touchdown reception. The Week 8 game against the Indianapolis Colts at Lucas Oil Stadium was the first time in McLaurin's professional career that he played in his hometown of Indianapolis. With the Commanders losing and 40 seconds remaining in the game, McLaurin made a critical 33-yard contested catch which set up the Commanders to score a one-yard rushing touchdown on the next play and winning the game with a final score of 17-16. He finished the game with 113 yards off six receptions against the Colts. McLaurin had eight receptions for a season-best 128 yards on Monday Night Football as the Commanders ended the Philadelphia Eagles' undefeated start to the season in Week 10. He finished the season with 77 receptions, a career-high 1,191 yards, and five touchdowns, and was also voted to his first Pro Bowl.

NFL career statistics

Regular season

Postseason

Personal life
McLaurin has been called by several nicknames during his NFL career, such as "Scary Terry", "F1", "The Captain", and "Moneybag McLaurin".

References

External links

Washington Commanders bio
Ohio State Buckeyes bio

1995 births
Living people
African-American players of American football
Players of American football from Indianapolis
American football wide receivers
Ohio State Buckeyes football players
Washington Commanders players
Washington Football Team players
Washington Redskins players
21st-century African-American sportspeople
National Conference Pro Bowl players